Wolf Stadler (born 6 March 1947) is a German former sailor. He competed at the 1972 Summer Olympics and the 1976 Summer Olympics.

References

External links
 

1947 births
Living people
German male sailors (sport)
Olympic sailors of West Germany
Sailors at the 1972 Summer Olympics – Tempest
Sailors at the 1976 Summer Olympics – Tempest
People from Miesbach (district)
Sportspeople from Upper Bavaria